Bahukutumbi or Bahukudumbi is an Indian surname. It is associated with South Indian Srivaishnava Brahmins from the state of Tamil Nadu. Another related surname is Pillaippakkam Bahukutumbi or Pillapakam Bahukutumbi

Notable people
 Bahukutumbi Raman, former chief of RAW and noted defence analyst
 Sujatha, noted Tamil writer, scientist and inventor of the Electronic Voting Machine
 Pillapakkam Bahukutumbi Radha

References

Surnames of Indian origin